Haugh may refer to:

People
David Haugh, American sports journalist
Gabrielle Haugh, American actress
John Haugh, Irish hurler
Kevin Haugh, Irish barrister and judge who served as the Attorney General of Ireland
Mark Haugh, former lead guitarist of American alternative rock band Caroline's Spine
Rachel Haugh, English architect

Places in the United Kingdom
Haugh, East Ayrshire
Haugh, a region in the Scottish city of Inverness
Haugh of Urr, Dumfries and Galloway
Haugh, Lincolnshire, hamlet and civil parish in the East Lindsey district
Packwood Haugh School, a preparatory school in Shropshire, England
The Haughs, home ground of the Turriff United Football Club

Other uses
Haugh (OE), an Old English and Scots term referring to a low-lying meadow in a river valley
Haugh Performing Arts Center, a theater at Citrus College, California
Haugh unit, a measure of egg protein based on egg white

See also
Hough (surname)